Mysterious Personal Shopper is a 2018 South Korean television series starring Choi Myung-gil, Park Ha-na, Wang Bit-na, Lee Eun-hyung, and Han Sang-jin. The series aired on KBS2 from Monday to Friday from 7:50 p.m. to 8:30 p.m. (KST) from February 26 to July 20, 2018.

Synopsis
Centered around the fashion tycoon President Eun's family, the mystery hidden inside the mansion is unveiled in an unpredictable way through the relationships and feuds between various people.

Cast

Main 
 Choi Myung-gil as Geum Young-sook
 Park Ha-na as Hong Se-yeon
 Wang Bit-na as Eun Kyung-hye
 Lee Eun-hyung as Lee Jae-joon
 Han Sang-jin as Jang Myung-hwan

Supporting 
  as Yoo Shin-hyuk
 Lee Ho-jae as Eun Ki-tae
 Lee Han-wi as Hong Pil-mok
 Jung Soo-young as Hong Sun-hee
  as Hong Chul-soo
 Kim Ji-sung as Hong Kang-hee
  as Park Soo-ran
  as Shin Young-ae
  as Kim Hyo-jung
  as Jeon Hyun-joo
  as Na Jin-beom
  as Ma Dong-seok
 Bae Noo-ri as Kkot-nim / Lee Jae-young
 Jo Mi-ryung as Eun Sook-ja
  as Goo Sa-ra
  as Sa Cha-soon
 Kim Yoo-jin as Na Ae-ri
  as Myung Hyun-joon
  as Min Woo-hyuk
  as Pierre Jang (Jang Hyuk-pil)

Viewership 
In this table,  represent the lowest ratings and  represent the highest ratings.
TNmS stop publishing their report from June 2018.

Awards and nominations

Notes

References

External links
  
 

Korean Broadcasting System television dramas
2018 South Korean television series debuts
Korean-language television shows
Television series about revenge
2018 South Korean television series endings